Jake Pates (born July 30, 1998) is an American snowboarder. He competed in the halfpipe at the 2018 Winter Olympics.

References

External links
 
 
 
 
 

 
 

1998 births
Living people
American male snowboarders
Sportspeople from Boulder, Colorado
Olympic snowboarders of the United States
Snowboarders at the 2018 Winter Olympics
Snowboarders at the 2016 Winter Youth Olympics
Youth Olympic gold medalists for the United States
21st-century American people